is a Japanese male curler.

At the national level, he is a 2004 Japan men's champion curler.

Teams

References

External links

Living people
Sportspeople from Hokkaido
Japanese male curlers
Japanese curling champions
Year of birth missing (living people)
Place of birth missing (living people)